The Shire of Creswick was a local government area about  west-northwest of Melbourne, the state capital of Victoria, Australia.

History

Creswick was first incorporated as a road district on 11 January 1859, and became a shire on 31 December 1863.

On 20 January 1995, the Shire of Creswick was abolished, and along with the Shire of Daylesford and Glenlyon and parts of the Shires of Kyneton and Talbot and Clunes, was merged into the newly created Shire of Hepburn.

Wards

The Shire of Creswick was divided into four ridings, each of which elected three councillors:
 Creswick Riding
 North Creswick Riding
 Northeast Riding
 South Riding

Towns and localities
 Allendale
 Broomfield
 Blampied
 Cabbage Tree
 Campbelltown
 Creswick*
 Creswick North
 Dean
 Glengower
 Kangaroo Hills
 Kingston
 Kooroocheang
 Lawrence
 Mollongghip
 Moorookyle
 Mount Prospect
 Newlyn
 Rockyn
 Smeaton
 Springmount
 Ullina
 Wattle Flat

* Council seat.

Population

* Estimate in 1958 Victorian Year Book.

References

External links
 Victorian Places - Creswick Shire

Creswick